(Praise him with heart and voice), BWV 220, is a church cantata by an unknown composer, formerly attributed to Johann Sebastian Bach.

History and text 
The cantata was written for the Feast of the Nativity of St. John the Baptist.

Scoring and structure 
The piece is scored for alto, tenor and bass soloists, four-part choir, flauto traverso, two oboes, two violins, viola and basso continuo.

It has five movements:
Chorale: 
Aria (tenor): 
Recitative (bass): 
Aria (alto): 
Chorus:

Recording 
Alsfelder Vokalensemble / Steintor Barock Bremen, Wolfgang Helbich. The Apocryphal Bach Cantatas. CPO, 1991.

References

External links 
 

Church cantatas
Bach: spurious and doubtful works
German church music